Lake Saint Clair is a lake in the U.S. state of Washington.

The lake's name is a transfer from Lake St. Clair, in Michigan.
The lake has four islands, two of them named (Dollar and Goat).

References

Lakes of Thurston County, Washington